Tansen is a crater on Mercury.  Its name was adopted by the International Astronomical Union (IAU) in 1976. The crater is named for Tansen, Mughal composer from the court of Akbar.

References

Impact craters on Mercury